S.S. Lazio finished in fifth in Serie A and reached the quarter final in the Coppa Italia. Prior to the season had Lazio with new Chairman Sergio Cragnotti made three important signings, with Paul Gascoigne, Giuseppe Signori and Aron Winter all joining the club.

Squad

Goalkeepers
  Valerio Fiori
  Fernando Orsi
  Paolo Di Sarno
  Flavio Roma

Defenders
  Cristiano Bergodi
  Mauro Bonomi
  Luigi Corino
  Roberto Cravero
  Djair
  Giuseppe Favalli
  Angelo Gregucci
  Luca Luzardi

Midfielders
  Roberto Bacci
  Thomas Doll
  Diego Fuser
  Aron Winter
  Paul Gascoigne
  Armando Madonna
  Dario Marcolin
  Claudio Sclosa
  Giovanni Stroppa

Attackers
  Giuseppe Signori
  Marco Nappi
  Maurizio Neri
  Karl-Heinz Riedle

Transfers

Winter

Competitions

Serie A

League table

Results by round

Matches

Top scorers
  Giuseppe Signori 26 (7)
  Diego Fuser 10
  Karl-Heinz Riedle 8
  Aron Winter 6
  Paul Gascoigne 4
  Roberto Cravero 3
  Thomas Doll 2

Coppa Italia

Second round

Eightfinals

Quarterfinals

Statistics

Players statistics

See also
 1992–93 Serie A
 1992–93 Coppa Italia

References

S.S. Lazio seasons
Lazio